Christopher Underwood (born October 6, 1992) is an American sales manager and reality television personality, best known for competing on and winning Survivor: Edge of Extinction.

Early life
Underwood was born in Surfside Beach, South Carolina and grew up in Myrtle Beach, South Carolina with his mother Ann; his father Todd, who is Panamanian; his brothers Spencer and Tyler; and his sister Ellen. He attended high school at the Christian Academy of Myrtle Beach. There he joined the boys' basketball team, setting the school record for points scored in a career. After graduating in 2011, he enrolled at Wofford College in Spartanburg, where he played football. In May 2014, he created a trail guide for river voyagers after completing a journey down river from Spartanburg to the Atlantic coast.

Career
Underwood, a double major at Wofford, graduated in 2015 with a Bachelor of Arts degree in Environmental studies and Spanish. After graduation, Underwood worked as a barista and a bartender, before going to work for LGCY Power. There, he serves as a district manager and energy consultant.

Survivor
In 2018, Underwood participated in Survivor: Edge of Extinction, the 38th overall season of Survivor. At the start, he was placed on the Manu tribe, along with returning Survivor castaways Kelley Wentworth and David Wright. On Day Eight, Underwood was blindsided by his tribe, who voted him out by a 5–2 margin. As he left the Tribal Council area, he came to a fork in the road. There, he read a sign telling him that he could either continue his game by taking a boat to the Edge of Extinction—a desolate island even more brutal than the one from which he just came—or go the other direction, to Ponderosa, and end his game for good. He chose the Edge of Extinction.

Upon arrival at the Edge, he was greeted by fellow castaways Reem Daly and Keith Sowell, both of whom Underwood had a hand in voting out of the main game earlier. Daly welcomed him with an acid tongue, as payback for voting her out on Day Three. By Night 16, he had also been joined by three more castaways: Rick Devens and Wendy Diaz from his old Manu tribe, and returning player Aubry Bracco, originally from the Kama tribe. On Day 17, Underwood competed with the other voted-out castaways in a challenge that would allow the winner of it to return to the main game. Part of this challenge involved untying knots to get to the next leg, and before the challenge began, Underwood was hindered by Sowell, who played an advantage that required Underwood to untie more knots than everyone else during the course of the challenge. Devens would go on to win this challenge and return to the main competition, while the rest, including Underwood, returned to the Edge of Extinction. Diaz and Sowell would subsequently elect to leave the Edge of Extinction, sending themselves permanently out of the game.

On Night 19, Underwood, Daly, and Bracco were introduced to Tribal Council as the first three members of the jury. By Night 34, they would be joined on the Edge of Extinction by several other voted-off castaways who also were sent to the jury, until there were 11 players total populating the Edge of Extinction. On Day 35, another challenge took place, once again with the winner earning the right to return to the main game. This time, though, the losers would be eliminated for good, with no more chances of getting back into the main game whatsoever. Former Kama member and returning castaway Joe Anglim held the lead near the very end, but he repeatedly failed to complete the final leg of the challenge. This opened the door for Underwood, who completed the entire challenge first, thus sending him back into the main game after 27 nights on the Edge of Extinction.

Once back in the main competition, Underwood quickly made new allies in an attempt to keep the target off his back. He gave Devens one half of a two-piece immunity idol that he had received earlier in the day, as a reward for winning the challenge. Underwood also helped fellow castaway Julie Rosenberg win immunity on Day 36. He also successfully convinced Lauren O'Connell to play her hidden immunity idol on him later that night, despite the fact that he wasn't the main target at that night's Tribal Council. The next night, Devens won individual immunity and gave back the other half of Underwood's idol, allowing Underwood to play it to save himself. On Day 38, Underwood himself won immunity, but realized that would not be enough to guarantee himself a victory in the finals. In a shocking move, Underwood gave the immunity necklace to Rosenberg so that he could try to eliminate Devens in a fire-making challenge that would determine who would join the other castaways, Rosenberg and Gavin Whitson, in the finals. Underwood would win this challenge, sending Devens out of the game again, and onto the jury.

At the Final Tribal Council, the jury questioned Underwood's worthiness of being in the finals, given that he was in the main game for only 13 days. In response, Underwood noted that because he was on the edge of Extinction for so long, he only had a few days to make big moves to show that he was deserving of the title of Sole Survivor. He went on to say that he did just that, by playing one idol correctly, flushing someone else's idol as well, and giving up immunity to compete in, and win, a fire-making battle, all in the span of just three days. Jury member Julia Carter also defended him, by pointing out that he had done more in his short time in the main game than the other finalists had done in 39 days. Underwood also stated that, in the game of Survivor, one cannot "screw around" with other people in the game nor "treat people like chess pieces;" rather, one must have real relationships with others in the game in order to get to the end and win.

On May 15, 2019, it was revealed that Underwood had won the title of Sole Survivor, by a 9–4–0 vote. He had received votes from everyone on the jury except Aurora McCreary, Devens, O'Connell, and Wentworth.

Personal life
In August 2015, Underwood met a young woman named Katelyn Jermstad at a college party. Soon after, the two were dating, and on April 26, 2019, they got married. After winning the title of Sole Survivor, Underwood said that he and his wife were planning to move to Chicago in the near future, and that he'd like to put some of his prize money into savings, while using some of it to travel before the couple starts having kids.

References

External links
Chris Underwood at LinkedIn
Official CBS biography page

1992 births
American people of Panamanian descent
Living people
Winners in the Survivor franchise
People from Greenville, South Carolina
Survivor (American TV series) winners
Wofford College alumni